is a mountain located on the border between Okuwa, Kiso District, and Iijima, Kamiina District, Nagano Prefecture, in the Chūbu region of Japan. It is also included on the list of "200 Famous Japanese Mountains."

Gallery

See also
Kiso Mountains
Mount Utsugi
Mount Akanagi

External links

Kiso Mountains
Japan Alps
Minamikoma